Arpad, the Gypsy (French: Arpad le Tzigane, German: Arpad, der Zigeuner) is a Hungarian-French-German television film series which aired on ORTF in France and ZDF in Germany between 1973 and 1974. It starred Robert Etcheverry as Arpad.

See also 
 List of German television series

External links 
 

1970s French television series
1970s Hungarian television series
1973 French television series debuts
1973 French television series endings
1973 German television series debuts
1974 German television series endings
Fictional representations of Romani people
French action television series
German action television series
Hungarian television shows
Television series set in the 17th century
Television series set in the 18th century
Television shows set in Austria
Television shows set in Hungary
ZDF original programming